Exocarpos aphyllus (common name leafless ballart) belongs to the sandalwood plant family (Santalaceae). Noongar names are chuk, chukk, dtulya and merrin. It is a species endemic to Australia.

Uses
Noongar (south-west Western Australian Indigenous Australians) boiled the stems in water to make decoctions for internal use to treat colds, and externally to treat sores. The mixture was also used to make poultices to be applied to the chest to treat "wasting diseases".

References

External links

Exocarpos aphyllus occurrence data from Australasian Virtual Herbarium

Bushfood
aphyllus
Flora of the Australian Capital Territory
Flora of New South Wales
Flora of Queensland
Flora of South Australia
Flora of Victoria (Australia)
Eudicots of Western Australia
Plants described in 1810
Taxa named by Robert Brown (botanist, born 1773)
Endemic flora of Australia